H. V. Hande (born 28 November 1927) is an Indian medical practitioner and a politician. He was elected to the Tamil Nadu legislative assembly from Park Town constituency as a Swatantra Party candidate in the 1967 and 1971 elections. He is known as 'ever genial Mangalorian' because of his ancestral roots in Mangalore.

In the 1980 elections, Hande stood from the Anna Nagar constituency as a candidate of the All India Anna Dravida Munnetra Kazhagam and lost by a margin of 699 votes to M. Karunanidhi. He also contested in the 2006 elections from Anna Nagar as a candidate of the Bharatiya Janata Party  but could only garner 9000 votes. He was National Council member of Bharatiya Janata Party in 2004.

He is also a writer having written books on Ramayana, Dr. Ambedkar and other topics. He has opened Hande Hospitals in  1984 at Shenoy Nagar, Chennai.

Posts held
 Minister of Health (1980-86)

References

External links
 Official website

Members of the Tamil Nadu Legislative Assembly
People from Coimbatore
1927 births
Living people
Swatantra Party politicians
20th-century Indian politicians